Sean Charles (born 18 May 1975) is a former Australian rules footballer who played with Melbourne, Carlton and St Kilda in the Australian Football League (AFL). Seen as a great talent from early on, he was promoted from the reserves after showing average form. His playing career had several interruptions, due to injury and a desire to spend more time at home. Throughout his career he suffered from a recurring scaphoid problem, and in his first and only game for Carlton he broke his leg. He was away from the game until 2000 when he was a surprise selection for St Kilda. He stayed with the club until 2001 when a lack of enthusiasm pushed him into retirement.

Notes

External links 
Demon Wiki profile

1975 births
Australian rules footballers from Victoria (Australia)
Carlton Football Club players
St Kilda Football Club players
Melbourne Football Club players
Indigenous Australian players of Australian rules football
Living people